Cathy's Curse (French: Une si gentille petite fille), also released in Canada under the title Cauchemares, is a 1977 supernatural horror film directed by Eddy Matalon and starring Alan Scarfe, Beverly Murray, and Randi Allen. The film follows a young girl who is possessed by the spirit of her deceased aunt. A co-production between Canada and France, it was shot on location in Westmount and Montreal, Quebec.

Though the film was critically panned upon initial release, with many deriding it as being overly derivative of other films of the period including The Exorcist and Carrie, it has since become a cult classic, some calling the film "so bad it's good".

Plot
In 1947, Robert Gimble flees with his young daughter, Laura, enraged to find that his wife has left with their son, George. Robert crashes their car into a snowbank, and he and Laura are burned alive in the car.

Thirty years later, George returns to his family home with his wife, Vivian, who is suffering from depression following a miscarriage, as well as the couple's eight-year-old daughter, Cathy. While exploring the home, Cathy uncovers an old doll along with a portrait of her aunt Laura in the attic. Meanwhile, Vivian becomes acquainted with the local neighbors, one of whom is a psychic medium who has a vision of Laura and her father's death while inside the home.

Cathy's behavior soon begins to change rapidly: She is cruel to the other neighborhood children, and exhibits destructive telekinetic powers. While home alone with Cathy, Mary, her nanny and housekeeper, dies after falling from a window. Cathy's violent and abusive behavior continues to alienate those around her, particularly her mother, who sinks deeper into a major depressive state. The psychic later visits the home, and finds Cathy in the attic. The psychic is confronted by a disturbing vision of herself, disfigured and burned. Later, Cathy tries to commit suicide by drowning herself in a river, but is saved by George.

George dismisses Vivian's fears that Cathy may be possessed or under the influence of supernatural forces connected to their house, dismissing the notions as delusions. One night, when George is away at work, a bedridden Vivian is left home alone with Cathy, who is watched by Paul, an elderly neighbor. Using her telekinetic powers, Cathy murders Paul, and Vivian subsequently discovers his disfigured corpse outside. Upstairs, she finds Cathy, covered in burn scars, who reveals herself to be Laura possessing Cathy's body. George, unable to contact Vivian or Paul by phone, returns to the house, where Cathy and Vivian are faced off in a confrontation. The three stare at one another, and Cathy grows tearful. Lying between them is the doll, impaled with a shard of glass.

Cast

Production
The film marked the first English-language feature by French director Eddy Matalon. It was filmed in on location in Westmount and Montreal, Quebec, Canada.

Release
The film was premiered in Montreal on July 29, 1977. It was later given regional releases in Canada, opening in Vancouver, British Columbia on November 11, 1977, and opened in Ottawa, Ontario the following week, November 18, 1977.

Critical reception
TV Guide gave a negative review of the film, calling it a "dull Canadian Exorcist-inspired horror film .... [full of ] bloody mutilations, cheesy makeup, and inept special effects."

In 2017, the film was featured on a Halloween-themed episode of Red Letter Media's Best of the Worst, together with Hack-O-Lantern and Vampire Assassin. The film received lukewarm reception for its moments of unintentional humor and unclear plot elements, with the hosts calling the film "frustrating".

Home media
The film was released in April 2017 by Severin Films on Blu-ray with a restored print.

References

External links

1977 films
1977 horror films
Canadian supernatural horror films
English-language Canadian films
Films about depression
Films about dolls
Films about spirit possession
Films about telekinesis
Films set in 1947
Films set in the 1970s
Films set in Montreal
Films shot in Montreal
21st Century Film Corporation films
1970s English-language films
1970s Canadian films